Frances Helen Allison (November 20, 1907June 13, 1989) was an American television and radio comedienne, personality, and singer.

She is best known for her starring role on the weekday NBC-TV puppet show Kukla, Fran and Ollie, which ran from 1947 to 1957, occasionally returning to the air until the mid-1980s. The trio also hosted The CBS Children's Film Festival, introducing international children's films, from 1967 to 1977.

Biography

Early years
Frances Helen Allison was born to Jesse Louis Allison  and Anna M. "Nan" (née Halpin) Allison in La Porte City, Iowa, where her father worked as a clerk in a grocery store until his stroke in 1913. They then moved in with her paternal grandparents, David Allison, a Civil War veteran, and Susan (née Booth) Allison. Their house still stands on Sycamore Street in LaPorte City.

She was a 1927 graduate of Coe College, where she was a member of Alpha Gamma Delta. She was a fourth-grade teacher for four years in Schleswig and Pocahontas (both in Iowa), before beginning her broadcasting career at WMT in Cedar Rapids, Iowa. (Another source describes WMT as "Waterloo radio station WMT." It moved to Cedar Rapids in 1935.) In 1934, Allison was among "14 sectional winners in the Hollywood Hotel radio contest."

Radio

She moved to Chicago, Illinois in 1937, where she was hired as a staff singer and personality on NBC Radio. A July 26, 1937, newspaper item reported, "Fran Allison, singer of WMT, Waterloo, Ia., makes her network debut in the WJZ-NBC club matinee at 3."

Beginning in 1937, she was a regular performer on The Breakfast Club, a popular Chicago (and NBC) radio show, and was a fixture for 25 years as "Aunt Fanny", a gossipy small-town spinster. Her Aunt Fanny character also appeared on the ABC-TV series, Ozark Jubilee, during the late 1950s. While in Chicago, she was also heard on Those Websters.

Kukla, Fran and Ollie

In 1947, the director of WBKB-TV in Chicago asked Burr Tillstrom if he could put together a puppet show for children, and he asked Allison, whom he had met during a World War II war bond tour, to join the show. She was the only human to appear on the live series, filling the role of big sister and cheery voice of reason as the puppets, known as the Kuklapolitan Players, engaged each other.

Other television work
Her television career continued after the initial run of Kukla, Fran and Ollie: in the late 1950s, she hosted The Fran Allison Show, a panel discussion TV program in Chicago; and appeared in television musical specials displaying her singing abilities,  including Many Moons (1954), Pinocchio with Mickey Rooney (1957), Damn Yankees (1967) with Phil Silvers and lastly Miss Pickerell (1972).

She had her own program, The Fran Allison Show on WGN-TV (1958-1960). In the 1980s, she hosted Prime Time, a show for senior citizens, on KHJ-TV in Los Angeles.

Recordings
Allison made records for the RCA Victor label. She had two minor pop hits. In 1950 her recording of "Peter Cottontail" charted at #26 around Easter of 1950. The next year her recording of "Too Young" achieved position #20. In both recordings she is backed by Jack Fascinato, who was the orchestra leader of Kukla, Fran and Ollie.

Recognition
In 1950, Allison was nominated for an Emmy Award as Most Outstanding Kinescoped Personality.  In 1959, she won two Chicago Emmy awards. In 2002, she was a Silver Circle honoree of the Chicago/Midwest Chapter of the National Academy of Television Arts and Sciences.

In 1967, Iowa Wesleyan University awarded her an honorary doctorate of letters.

Personal life
Allison was married to music publisher Archie Levington. In her free time, she devoted her efforts to promoting mental health. From a profile in the Freeport Journal-Standard, "For mental health, she will travel anywhere, anytime."

Death
In later life, Allison lived in Van Nuys, California. She died June 13, 1989, aged 81, from myelodysplasia in Sherman Oaks, California, and was buried in Mount Calvary Cemetery in Cedar Rapids, Iowa. She was survived by a brother, saxophonist James "Lynn" Allison.

Legacy
For contributions to the television industry, Allison was honored with a star on the Hollywood Walk of Fame at 6763 Hollywood Boulevard. She was inducted into the Chicago Television Academy's Silver Circle in 2002.

She appeared with puppets Kukla and Ollie on a 44¢ US commemorative postage stamp in the "Early TV Memories" series, issued on August 11, 2009.

References

External links

 
 
 Fran Allison  at TV.com 
 Allison at the Museum of TV 
 Tribute website
 

1907 births
1989 deaths
20th-century American actresses
20th-century American singers
20th-century American women singers
20th-century American comedians
American radio personalities
American television personalities
American women television personalities
People from La Porte City, Iowa
RCA Victor artists
Coe College alumni
Actresses from Iowa
Singers from Iowa
Deaths from blood disease